Manuel Diaz (born San Juan, Puerto Rico) is the long-time head tennis coach at the University of Georgia. He has coached the Bulldogs to four NCAA championships, starting in 1999 and notably in 2007, when John Isner headed the team.

He was inducted into the Georgia Tennis Hall of Fame in 2000. He is in second place behind his mentor Dan Magill on the all-time SEC wins list. Under Diaz, Georgia has had 32 different players earn All-American honors

Personal life
Diaz is married to the former Suzanne Rondeau of Toronto, Canada, and they have three sons. The middle son, Eric, plays tennis for the University of Georgia.

References
Georgia Bulldogs bio

American tennis coaches
Living people
University of Georgia alumni
Georgia Bulldogs tennis coaches
Sportspeople from San Juan, Puerto Rico
Georgia Bulldogs tennis players
Year of birth missing (living people)
Puerto Rican male tennis players
Central American and Caribbean Games silver medalists for Puerto Rico
Central American and Caribbean Games medalists in tennis